Farmers Association of Pakistan (FAP), also known as the SME Farmers Association of Pakistan is a farmers' organization based in Pakistan, described as "the most prominent lobbying organization of landlords". 
It is one of the more than twenty organizations that form part of the Pakistan Kissan Rabta Committee. 

Shah Mehmood Qureshi is the president of the Farmers Association of Pakistan.

References

Organisations based in Islamabad
Agricultural organisations based in Pakistan